This is a list of recording artists who have reached number one on the singles chart in Austria since January 1989.

All acts are listed alphabetically.
Solo artists are alphabetized by last name (unless they use only their first name, e.g. Akon, listed under A), Groups by group name excluding "a," "an" and "the."
Featured artists that have been given credit on the record are included

0–9
112 (1)
2 Unlimited (1)
4 Non Blondes (1)
21 Savage (1)
24kGoldn (1)
50 Cent (1)
220 Kid (1)

A

Ace of Base (1)
Bryan Adams (2)
Adele (2)
Aerosmith (1)
Aitch (1)
 AriBeatz (1)
Afroman (1)
Christina Aguilera (2)
AK Ausserkontrolle (1)
Akon (2)
 Albertino (1)
Lily Allen (1)
Dr Alban (2)
Alexandra Stan (1)
All-4-One (1)
Anastacia (1)
MØ (1)
 Anton (1)
Apache 207 (3)
Die Ärzte (1)
Atomic Kitten (1)
The Avener (1)
Aventura (1)
Die Ärzte (1)
Asaf Avidan (1)
Avicii (3)
Axwell & Ingrosso (1)
 Ayliva (1)

B

Babylon Zoo (1)
Backstreet Boys (2)
Badmómzjay (1)
Bausa (2)
Robin Beck (1)
Andreas Bourani (2)
Lou Bega (1)
Bia (1)
Billen Ted (1)
Ben (1)
Lauren Bennett (1)
Lory "Bonnie" Bianco (1)
Justin Bieber (4)
The Black Eyed Peas (4)
Mary J Blige (1)
James Blunt (2)
The Bosshoss (1)
Jala Brat (1)
Bro'Sis (1)
 Dave Brown (1)
Bruno Mars (1)
Andrea Bocelli (1)
Bon Jovi (1)
Bonez MC (9)
Bomfunk MC's (1)
Toni Braxton (1)
Sarah Brightman (1)
Buddy (1)
Bushido (1)

C

C+C Music Factory (1)
Camila Cabello (1)
RAF Camora (12)
Dan Caplen (1)
Cappella (1)
Capital Bra (16)
Mariah Carey (2)
Yvonne Catterfeld (1)
Charles & Eddie (1)
Cher (1)
Ch!pz (1)
Melanie C (1)
Alex C (1)
Chris Brown (1)
Nina Chuba (1)
Clean Bandit (3)
Bradley Cooper (1)
Buba Corelli (1)
Crazy Town (1)
 The Cratez (1)
Sinéad O'Connor (1)
Cro (2)
Culture Beat (1)
Miley Cyrus (1)

D

DaBaby (1)
Gigi D'Agostino (3)
DCUP (1)
Daft Punk (1)
Shirin David (1)
Jason Derulo (2)
Janieck Devy (1)
Dido (2)
Celine Dion (1)
Aura Dione (1)
Iann Dior (1)
Disturbed (1)
 DJ Robin (1)
 DJ The Wave (1)
DNA (1)
Dragonette (1)
Dua Lipa (1)
Duck Sauce (1)
Duffy (1)
Dynoro (1)

E

E Nomine (1)
Eamon (1)
Edelweiss (1)
Beatrice Egli (1)
Eiffel 65 (2)
 El Profesor (1)
Elton John (1)
Caro Emerald (1)
Eminem (5)
Eno (1)
Enigma (1)
Erasure (1)
Erste Allgemeine Verunsicherung (1)
Faith Evans (1)
Nathan Evans (1)
George Ezra (1)

F

Die Fantastischen Vier (1)
Alle Farben (1)
Fergie (1)
Tiziano Ferro (1)
Rainhard Fendrich (1)
Fettes Brot (1)
Fine Young Cannibals (1)
Helene Fischer (1)
Flo Rida (2)
Luis Fonsi (2)
Thomas Forstner (1)
Fool's Garden (1)
French Affair (1)
Freshlyground (1)
The Fugees (1)
Fun (1)
Nelly Furtado (1)

G

Andreas Gabalier (1)
Lady Gaga (4)
Gayle (1)
Die Gerd-Show (1)
 Gim (1)
Jess Glynne (1)
Gnarls Barkley (1)
Jess Glynne (1)
Thomas Godoj (1)
Hubert von Goisern (1)
Goleo and Pille (1)
GoonRock (1)
Gotye (1)
Ellie Goulding (1)
Herbert Grönemeyer (1)
David Guetta (5)
Gzuz (2)

H

Haddaway (1)
Haiducii (1)
Calvin Harris (1)
Hanson (1)
Mýa (1)
Luca Hänni (1)
David Hasselhoff (2)
 Raoul Haspel (1)
Chesney Hawkes (1)
Hozier (1)
Whitney Houston (1)
James Newton Howard (1)
 Hugel (1)

I

Imany (1)

J

Felix Jaehn (2)
Jay-Z (1)
Jawsh 685 (1)
Jive Bunny and the Mastermixers (1)
Joker Bra (1)
Holly Johnson (1)
Juanes (1)
Juju (2)

K

Kaoma (1)
Kasimir1441 (1)
Kay One (1)
K'naan (1)
Leila K (1)
 Professor Kaiser (1)
Nick Kamen (1)
 Kanui & Lulu (1)
KC Rebell (3)
Ronan Keating (1)
Alicia Keys (1)
Kesha (2)
Wiz Khalifa (1)
Kimbra (1)
The Kid Laroi (1)
Kid Rock (1)
 A Klana Indiana (2)
The KLF (1)
Klingande (1)
Katja Krasavice (1)

L

Laid Back (1)
Las Ketchup (1)
Marit Larsen (1)
Avril Lavine (1)
Jennifer Lawrence (1)
Leona Lewis (2)
Lil Nas X (2)
Lilly Wood and the Prick (1)
Liquido (1)
LMFAO (1)
Pietro Lombardi (2)
Loreen (1) 
Londonbeat (1)
Los Del Rio (1)
Lost Frequencies (2)
Demi Lovato (2)
Dennis Lloyd (1)
Lucilectric (1)
Lucenzo (1)
Jennifer Lopez (1)
Loredana (2)
Los Umbrellos (1)
Luciano (3)
Lukas Graham (1)

M

Amy Macdonald (1)
Macklemore (1)
 Macloud (3)
Bobby McFerrin (1)
Wes (1)
Mad'House (1)
Madonna (1)
Major Lazer (1)
 Makko (1)
Måneskin (1)
Maroon 5 (1)
Marshmello (1)
 Mathea (1)
Mehrzad Marashi (1)
Mando Diao (1)
Zayn Malik (1)
Sam Martin (2)
Mattafix (1)
Ava Max (1)
 Max Brothers (1)
Meat Loaf (1)
Mark Medlock (1)
Shawn Mendes (1)
Mero (5)
Pras Michel (1)
Robert Miles (1)
Milky Chance (1)
Milli Vanilli (1)
Kylie Minogue (1)
 Miksu (3)
Mr. President (1)
Mo-Do (1)
Janelle Monáe (1)
Monrose (2)
 Cornelia Mooswalder (1)
James Morrison (1)
Mr. Big (1)
Mr. Probz (1)
Olly Murs (1)

N

Anna Naklab (1)
Nickelback (1)
Anne-Marie (2)
No Angels (3)
No Mercy (1)

O

 ODB (1)
OMC (1)
OneRepublic (1)
Oomph! (1)
Olivia (1)
DJ Ötzi (2)
Don Omar (1)
OMI (1)
One Direction (1)
Overground (1)
O-Zone (1)

P

Nik P. (1)
Nu Pagadi (1)
Sean Paul (2)
Passenger (1)
Laura Pausini (1)
Pentatonix (1)
Kim Petras (1)
Oli.P (2)
Katy Perry (3)
Gary Pine (1)
Pink (3)
Pitbull (3)
Pizzera & Jaus (1)
Post Malone (1)
Power Pack (1)
Eric Prydz (1)
PSY (1)
Puff Daddy (1)
The Pussycat Dolls (1)
Charlie Puth (1)

R

Stefan Raab (1)
Rag'n'Bone Man (1)
Rayvon (1)
Rednex (2)
Tobias Regner (1)
Matthias Reim (1)
Bebe Rexha (1)
Rihanna (5)
The Righteous Brothers (1)
Right Said Fred (1)
 Rising Girl (1)
Roddy Ricch (1)
Olivia Rodrigo (2)
Marlon Roudette (1)
Roxette (1)
Rudimental (1)
Nate Ruess (1)
Emilia (1)

S

Aneta Sablik (1)
Sak Noel (1)
Salt-N-Pepa (1)
Cesár Sampson (1)
Samra (6)
Schnuffel (1)
Daniel Schuhmacher (1)
Robin Schulz (3)
 Schürze (1)
Scissor Sisters (1)
The Script (1)
Scooter (1)
Scorpions (1)
Schnappi (1)
Seiler und Speer (1)
Shaggy (1)
Shakira (3)
Ed Sheeran (6)
Shindy (1)
Sia (2)
Sido (1)
Silbermond (1)
Bob Sinclar (1
Sam Smith (1)
Snap! (1)
Snoop Dogg (2)
Sofiane (1)
Martin Solveig (1)
Britney Spears (3)
Spice Girls (1)
Sportfreunde Stiller (1)
Bruce Springsteen (1)
Lisa Stansfield (1)
 Starmaniacs (1)
Rod Stewart (1)
Sting (1)
Stromae (1)
Christina Stürmer (5)
Harry Styles (1)
Nena (1)
Sugababes (1)
Summer Cem (2)

T

 T-Low (2)
t.A.T.u (1)
T.I. (1)
Taio Cruz (1)
Tacabro (1)
Adel Tawil (1)
Robin Thicke (1)
Jasmine Thompson (1)
Michel Teló (1)
Tic Tac Toe (1)
Timbaland (1)
Meghan Trainor (1)
Triggerfinger (1)
Die Toten Hosen (1)
ATC (1)
Tokio Hotel (4)
Tones and I (1)
Emilíana Torrini (1)
Trackshittaz (2)
 Michael Tschuggnall (1)
Martin Tungevaag (1)

U

U2 (1)
U96 (1)
UB40 (1)
Ufo361 (3)
Unique II (1)
Uncle Kracker (1)
Midge Ure (1)
Usher (1)

V

Suzanne Vega (1)
Verena (1)
Vize (1)

W

 Marco Wagner (1)
Alan Walker (2)
Wanda (1)
Des'ree (1)
Wax (1)
The Weeknd (1)
Wet Wet Wet (1)
Wham! (1)
Wheatus (1)
Kim Wilde (1)
Wildbwoys (1)
will.i.am (2)
Freedom Williams (1)
Pharrell Williams (3)
Robbie Williams (1)
 Oliver Wimmer (1)
Kate Winslet (1)
Conchita Wurst (1)

Y

Kate Yanai (1)
Daddy Yankee (1)
Francesco Yates (1)
Y-ass (1)
Yolanda Be Cool (1)
Younotus (1)

Z

Måns Zelmerlöw (1)
 Zlatko (1)

See also 

Ö3 Austria Top 40

External links 
Official Austrian singles chart
Ö3 Austria Top 75
Austrian chart archive

References

Austria
Austrian record charts